The Johns Hopkins Center for Health Security (abbreviated CHS) is an independent, nonprofit organization of the Johns Hopkins Bloomberg School of Public Health. The center works to protect people's health from epidemics and pandemics and ensures that communities are resilient to major challenges. The center is also concerned with biological weapons and the biosecurity implications of emerging biotechnology.

The Center for Health Security gives policy recommendations to the United States government, the World Health Organization and the UN Biological Weapons Convention.

History
The Center for Health Security began as the Johns Hopkins Center for Civilian Biodefense Strategies (CCBS) in 1998 at the Johns Hopkins Bloomberg School of Public Health. D. A. Henderson served as the founding director. At that time, the center was the first and only academic center focused on biosecurity policy and practice.

At one point around 2003, CHS had become part of a new umbrella organization called the Institute for Global Health and Security at the Johns Hopkins Bloomberg School of Public Health.

In November 2003, some of the leaders left Johns Hopkins to join the University of Pittsburgh Medical Center (UPMC), and launched their own Center for Biosecurity of UPMC. This move apparently split the organization in two, and it is unclear what happened to the old organization.

On April 30, 2013, the UPMC Center changed its name from "Center for Biosecurity of UPMC" to "UPMC Center for Health Security". This name change reflected a broadening of the scope of CHS's work.

In January 2017, the JHU Center became part of the Johns Hopkins Bloomberg School of Public Health. Its domain name changed from upmchealthsecurity.org to centerforhealthsecurity.org.

Funding
In 2002, the center received a $1 million grant from the US federal government.

Before 2017, CHS was heavily reliant on government funding.

In January 2017, the Open Philanthropy Project awarded a $16 million grant over three years to the Center for Health Security. Another grant of $19.5 million was awarded in September 2019.

Publications
The Center for Health Security publishes three online newsletters:
 Clinicians' Biosecurity News (formerly the Clinicians' Biosecurity Network Report), published twice each month
 Health Security Headlines, a news digest published 3 times a week (previously called Biosecurity Briefing, then Biosecurity News in Brief starting in 2009, then Biosecurity News Today starting in 2010 or 2011, and finally Health Security Headlines starting in 2013; the digest used to also be weekly until in February 2009, HSH was published daily from 2009 until late 2021 when it was changed to 3 times per week to accommodate the COVID-19 Update briefings published twice a week since January 2020)
 Preparedness Pulsepoints, published weekly

It maintains and edits a peer reviewed journal Health Security which is part of the Mary Ann Liebert publishing group.

It also provides editorial oversight for the journal Health Security, which was launched in 2003 and called Biosecurity and Bioterrorism: Biodefense Strategy, Practice, and Science until 2015.

CHS published the blog The Bifurcated Needle until 2020.

The Open Philanthropy Project's grant writeup of CHS noted several publications:
 
 
 

The center has published in journals including JAMA and The Lancet. A full list of publications is available on the CHS website. , the list shows more than 400 publications.

Major conferences and tabletop exercises

Operation Dark Winter

From June 22–23, 2001, CHS co-hosted Operation Dark Winter, a senior-level bioterrorism attack simulation involving a covert and widespread smallpox attack on the United States.

Atlantic Storm
On January 14, 2005, CHS helped to host Atlantic Storm, a table-top smallpox bioterrorism simulation.

Clade X
On May 15, 2018, the Center hosted Clade X, a day-long pandemic tabletop exercise that simulated a series of National Security Council–convened meetings of 10 US government leaders, played by individuals prominent in the fields of national security or epidemic response.

Drawing from actual events, Clade X identified important policy issues and preparedness challenges that could be solved with sufficient political will and attention. These issues were designed in a narrative to engage and educate the participants and the audience.

Clade X was livestreamed on Facebook and extensive materials from the exercise are available online.

Event 201 
On October 18, 2019, the CHS partnered with the World Economic Forum and the Bill and Melinda Gates Foundation to host the tabletop exercise Event 201 in New York City. According to the CHS, "the exercise illustrated areas where public/private partnerships will be necessary during the response to a severe pandemic in order to diminish large-scale economic and societal consequences".

Event 201 simulated the effects of a fictional coronavirus passing to humans via infected pig farms in Brazil with "no possibility of a vaccine being available in the first year". The simulation ended after 18 months with 65 million deaths from the coronavirus.

Other

 Improving Epidemic Response: Building Bridges Between the US and China. May 2012.
 Considerations for the Reauthorization of the Pandemic and All-Hazards Preparedness Act (PAHPA). March 2012.
 U.S. Preparedness for a Nuclear Detonation. October 2011.
 Charting the Future of Biosecurity: Ten Years After the Anthrax Attacks. October 2011.
 Advancing US Resilience to a Nuclear Catastrophe. May 2011.
 Preserving National Security: The Growing Role of the Life Sciences. March 2011.
 Improving Global Health, Strengthening Global Security. November 2010.
 The State of BIOPreparedness: Lessons from Leaders, Proposals for Progress. September 2010.
 Preparing to Save Lives and Recover After a Nuclear Detonation: Implications for US Policy. April 2010.
 The 2009 H1N1 Experience: Policy Implications for Future Infectious Disease Emergencies. March 2010.
 Resilient American Communities: Progress In Practice and Policy. December 10, 2009.
 Prevention of Biothreats: A Look Ahead. October 6, 2009.
 Disease, Disaster, and Democracy: The Public's Stake in Health Emergency Planning. May 2006.
 Bulls, Bears, and Birds: Preparing the Financial Industry for a Pandemic. September 2005.
 Conference on Biosafety and Biorisks. May 2005.
 The Public as an Asset, Not a Problem: A Summit on Leadership During Bioterrorism. February 2003.
 2nd National Symposium on Medical and Public Health Response to Bioterrorism. November 2000.
 National Symposium on Medical and Public Health Response to Bioterrorism. February 1999.

See also

 Alfred P. Sloan Foundation
 Anti-terrorism legislation
 Biological Weapons Anti-Terrorism Act of 1989
 Cartagena Protocol on Biosafety
 Center for Strategic and International Studies
 Convention on Biological Diversity
 Council of Europe Convention on the Prevention of Terrorism
 Crimson Contagion
 European BioSafety Association
 European Programme for Intervention Epidemiology Training
 Eurosurveillance
 Global catastrophic risk
 Global Health Security Initiative
 Health Threat Unit
 International Health Regulations
 Johns Hopkins Berman Institute of Bioethics
 Office of the Assistant Secretary for Preparedness and Response
 Open Philanthropy Project § Biosecurity
 Operation Dark Winter
 Pandemic and All-Hazards Preparedness Reauthorization Act of 2013
 Public Health Emergency Preparedness
 PublicHealthEmergency.gov

References

External links
 "Experts predicted a coronavirus pandemic years ago. Now it's playing out before our eyes" CNN
 "SPARS Pandemic Scenario"
 
 The Bifurcated Needle, the Center for Health Security's blog
 Clinicians' Biosecurity News, a twice monthly newsletter published by the Center
 Rad Resilient City; Rad Resilient City Preparedness Checklist Actions

Health think tanks
Public health organizations
University of Pittsburgh
Johns Hopkins Bloomberg School of Public Health
Think tanks based in the United States
Nonpartisan organizations in the United States
1998 establishments in the United States
Think tanks established in 1998